Diogo Guedes Nunes (born 10 November 1996) is a Portuguese footballer who plays for São Martinho as a centre back.

Football career
On 11 March 2015, Nunes made his professional debut with Leixões in a 2014–15 Segunda Liga match against Académico Viseu.

References

External links

Stats and profile at LPFP 

1996 births
Living people
Sportspeople from Matosinhos
Portuguese footballers
Association football defenders
Campeonato de Portugal (league) players
Liga Portugal 2 players
Leixões S.C. players
Sporting CP B players
Sport Benfica e Castelo Branco players
F.C. Arouca players
A.R. São Martinho players